Magnús Kjartansson (25 February 1919 – 28 July 1981) was an Icelandic journalist, writer, politician and former minister. From 1947 to 1971, he was an editor of Thjódviljinn newspaper (in Icelandic Þjóðviljinn) that became an organ of the political formation Alþýðubandalagið.

He was assigned as minister for social insurance during a coalition government ruling the country.

External links 

 Non auto-biography of Magnús Kjartansson on the parliament website

1919 births
1981 deaths
Magnus Kjartansson
Magnus Kjartansson
Magnus Kjartansson
20th-century journalists